Alexis Lemaire (born 1980) is a mental calculation world record holder. He holds a Ph.D. in Computer Science related to artificial intelligence from the University of Reims. He is also the owner of world records for mentally calculating the 13th root of 100-digit numbers and 200-digit numbers.

On 10 May 2002, he calculated the 13th root of a 100-digit number in 13.55 seconds, beating the record held by Willem Klein (88.8 seconds) and the somewhat less official record of Gert Mittring (39 seconds). On 23 November 2004, Mittring tried to beat Lemaire's record, but his time of 11.8 seconds was not counted as official, as one organization's rules had decided to stop recognizing records for root extraction of random numbers due to the difficulty of standardizing the challenge. Less than a month later (17 December 2004) Lemaire beat his own record, with a time of 3.625 seconds— this included the time it took him to read the number, calculate its root, and recount the answer. He found the 13th root of the 100-digit number  which is 45,792,573.

Following this achievement, Lemaire gave up trying to improve his performance at calculating roots of 100-digit numbers, and moved on to 200-digit numbers with many attempts as described on the rules page (see 13th root ). Like an athlete, he trains his brain daily for this task. On 6 April 2005, he calculated the 13th root of a 200-digit number in 8 minutes 33 seconds.
By 30 July 2007, Alexis got his time down to 77.99 seconds at the Museum of the History of Science, Oxford and by 15 November his time was further decreased to 72.4 seconds.
His latest achievement came on 10 December 2007, where he mentally extracted the 13th root of a random 200-digit number in 70.2 seconds.
The so-called 'mathlete' produced the answer of 2,407,899,883,032,220 at London's Science Museum.

A computer was used to produce the random 200-digit number, from which he tried to extract the 13th root. The museum's curator of mathematics, Jane Wess, said, "He sat down and it was all very quiet -- and all of a sudden he amazingly just cracked it. I believe that it is the highest sum calculated mentally. He seems to have a large memory and he's made this his life's ambition. It's quite remarkable to see it happen. A very small number of people have this extraordinary ability; nowadays there is only a handful."
Lemaire says that his mental feats also have very useful applications in artificial intelligence, his chosen field.

References

University of Reims Champagne-Ardenne alumni
1980 births
Living people
Mental calculators